Marian Bronisław Tomaszewski (13 August 1922 – 5 June 2020) was a Polish scout leader, an officer of the 2nd Polish Corps and a tank commander in the 6th Armoured Regiment "Children of Lwów" during World War II. After the war he spent nearly 45 years in exile in Italy and the United Kingdom where he later settled. He was regarded as one of the leaders of the Polish community in Manchester. He was the head of the Tomaszewski family, which acquired the Palace of Pławowice at the turn of the millennium.

Second World War

Tomaszewski lived in the Winna Góra villa district of Przemyśl. At high school he had risen to leader or Drużynowy of the Scouting Movement in the area. At the outbreak of the Second World War in September 1939, Tomaszewski was only 17 years old and ineligible for active military duty. However, he persuaded the recruiting officer to accept his enlistment and he served in an artillery battery until the end of fighting on 6 October. Due to his leadership role in Scouting, the Gestapo issued a warrant for Tomaszewski's immediate arrest, obliging him to escape into Soviet controlled Przemyśl by crossing the river San under cover of darkness.

Unknown to him, a similar warrant had been issued by the Soviet secret police, the NKVD, and he was captured and sentenced to 15 years hard labour in Siberia for "counter-revolutionary activity". Within the first two years of imprisonment, Tomaszewski (and his known aliases) are recorded to have escaped seven times from the Soviet authorities. He was, during his seventh attempt, preparing to cross Afghanistan into British controlled India when the Polish-Soviet Armistice was signed. After enlisting in the newly established "Anders Army", he underwent military training in Persia, Iraq, Palestine and Egypt. Later, in an ad-hoc multinational regiment, he participated in the disarming of Vichy troops stationed in Syrian forts as his first assignment.

In 1941 Tomaszewski was assigned to the 6th Armoured Regiment "Children of Lwów" and took part in the Siege of Tobruk. In 1944 he was engaged in the bloody Battle of Monte Cassino. Following the fall of the monastery on 18 May, Polish forces faced the Hitler Line which blocked the road to Rome. Tomaszewski, posted to the regimental command HQ, directed an armoured assault by Sherman tanks on the strongpoint of Piedimonte San Germano, then held by detachments of crack German paratroopers equipped with anti-tank emplacements. Although faced with difficult terrain, the lack of expected Indian infantry support and dogged German resistance they succeeded in taking the town. The anniversary of the town's liberation is still celebrated by its inhabitants. Tomaszewski continued to serve in the 2nd Polish Corps until the end of the Italian Campaign in 1945.

Post-war
After the end of the Second World War, Poland fell behind the Soviet Iron Curtain, with a puppet Communist government. Tomaszewski was warned by Polish sources that the Polish Secret Service (UB) had marked him for arrest as an "enemy of the proletariat" should he ever return to his homeland. After some years in Italy, Tomaszewski moved to Great Britain where he continued his studies at Trinity College, Dublin, the University of Glasgow and the University of Edinburgh. He founded the Bury Polish Circle and remained an active member of the Polonia community. He died in Bury, England in June 2020 at the age of 97.

Palace of Pławowice
Lieutenant Colonel Marian Bronisław Tomaszewski was the owner of the Palace of Pławowice. In 2004 he and his daughter Maria organised and funded the Third Reunion of Poets  in order to revive the literary and scholarly traditions dating back to the Morstin era. Despite the desperate state of the palace and the heinous damage caused to the building by years of communist era neglect, the Tomaszewski family have undertaken costly steps to secure fragile sections of the building and they plan to renovate the whole palace. Tomaszewski was quoted in the Dziennik Polski (a Polish language newspaper published in Britain) of 9 June 2007 as describing the palace's role not only as the family seat but also as an important place of Polish cultural heritage for the general public.

Honours and awards
Commander’s Cross of the Order of Polonia Restituta.
Cross of Valour – two times
Gold Cross of Merit
Silver Cross of Merit
Monte Cassino Cross
Africa Star
Italy Star
1939–1945 Star.

References

1922 births
2020 deaths
Alumni of Trinity College Dublin
People from Przemyśl
Polish expatriates in the United Kingdom
Polish military personnel of World War II
Recipients of the Cross of Valour (Poland)
Recipients of the Gold Cross of Merit (Poland)